Fernando Ansola (27 January 1940 – 30 June 1986) was a Spanish footballer who played as a forward for La Liga club Valencia.

References

1940 births
1986 deaths
People from Gipuzkoa
La Liga players
Segunda División players
Spain international footballers
Spanish footballers
Association football forwards
Basque Country international footballers
Real Oviedo players
Real Sociedad footballers
Real Betis players
Valencia CF players